George Horsey , a scholar of Westminster School and graduate of Trinity College, Cambridge was the Dean of Ross, Ireland  from 1637 until 1639.

References

Deans of Ross, Ireland
People educated at Westminster School, London
Alumni of Trinity College, Cambridge
Year of birth missing
Year of death missing
17th-century Irish Anglican priests